Miss Austria is a national Beauty pageant in Austria.

History
Began in 1929 the Miss Österreich  managed by Illustriate Kronen Zeitug Agency. Since then the winner went to International Pageant of Pulchritude or famously called as Miss Universe. Lisl Goldarbeiter, Miss Austria 1929 of Vienna won the first International competition.
 Started in 1929, Miss Austria franchised the Miss Europe license.
 Started in 1953, Miss Austria franchised the Miss Universe license.
 Started in 1955, Miss Austria franchised the Miss World license.
 In 1956 Erich Reindl took over the brand of Miss Österreich or Miss Austria.
 Started in 1960, Miss Austria franchised the Miss International license.
 In 1992 Emil Bauer bought the Miss Austria Corporation.
 In 2012 Silvia Schachermayer (formerly Silvia Hackl, Miss Austria 2004) handled the Miss Austria Corporation.
 Started in 2016, Miss Austria franchised the Miss Earth license.
 In 2018, Joerg Rigger made his debut to be the CEO of Miss Austria Corporation.
 The Miss Austria Organization has returned the Miss World and Miss Universe participation franchises. Therefore, Austria is not allowed to compete on both Miss World and Miss Universe pageants starting in 2018.
Note: In the pageant of Miss Austria, the first and second placed candidates of each federal state take part. So in the final there are 18 delegates from the 9 Bundesländer.

Franchise holders
The Miss Austria winner traditionally goes to Miss Universe and Miss World competitions, it sometimes could be allocated to Miss Europe. A Runner-up will take over if the winner does not qualify to represent Austria on World stage. In Schachermayer directorship between 2015 and 2017 the Miss Austria result divided into Top 3 classification winners. Before announcing the grand winner of Miss Austria, the Top 3 automatically awarded as Miss Earth Austria, Miss World Austria and lastly, Miss Universe Austria.

Titleholders

Gallery

Big Four pageants representatives
The following women have represented Austria in the Big Four international beauty pageants, the four major international beauty pageants for women. These are Miss World, Miss Universe, Miss International and Miss Earth.

Miss Universe Austria

The Miss Austria competes at Miss Universe pageant. Between 2005-2012, Austria did not participate at the Miss Universe pageant due to lack sponsorship. In 2013, Miss Austria Organization regained the license to compete at the Miss Universe pageant. In 2018, the organization returned the local franchise to the MUO organization.

Miss World Austria

Miss Earth Austria

Began 2016 Miss Earth Austria becomes a major title of Miss Austria Organization. In 2018 the Miss Earth Austria moved to another franchise holder.

Different spelling of names:
http://www.vienna.at/valentina-schlager-ist-miss-austria-2010/news-20100328-08474196

See also 
 Miss Germany
 Miss France
 Miss Switzerland

External links 
 Miss Austria

Beauty pageants in Austria
1948 establishments in Austria
Austrian awards
Austria